Tolikara Football Club or Toli FC (formerly known as Persitoli Tolikara) is an  Indonesian football club based in Tolikara Regency, Highland Papua. Club played in Liga 3. 

On 9 November 2020, Persitoli Tolikara officially rename to Toli FC, along with the launch of its new logo which took place at the Grand Alison Sentani Hotel, Jayapura Regency.

Persitoli stadium named Pendidikan Stadium. Its location was in downtown Wamena, Papua.

Honours
 Liga 3 Papua
 Champion (1): 2021

References

Football clubs in Indonesia
Football clubs in Highland Papua
Association football clubs established in 2003
2003 establishments in Indonesia